Lucas Demare (July 14, 1910 – September 6, 1981) was an Argentine film director, screenwriter, and film producer prominent in the Cinema of Argentina in the 1940s, 1950s and 1960s.

Biography
At the 1943 Argentine Film Critics Association Awards, Demare won Silver Condor awards for Best Director, Best Film and numerous other awards for The Gaucho War (1942), a film which is considered by critics in Argentina to be one of the best films in its history. He won further awards including Best Film and Director for Su mejor alumno (1944) at the 1945 Argentine Film Critics Association Awards. He wrote and directed other films such as El cura gaucho (1941), La calle grita (1948), Mi noche triste (1951), Zafra (1958) and La Boda (1964). His last film as a director was Hombres de mar in 1977. In 1964, he was a member of the jury at the 14th Berlin International Film Festival. He died of a heart attack at the age of 71 in 1981.

His brother was the composer Lucio Demare who wrote several film scores for Lucas' productions.

Filmography as director

References

External links

 

1910 births
1981 deaths
Argentine film directors
Male screenwriters
Argentine film producers
People from Buenos Aires
Silver Condor Award for Best Director winners
Argentine people of Italian descent
20th-century Argentine screenwriters
20th-century Argentine male writers